Muhammed Taher Pasha (1879 – 29 January 1970) was an Egyptian doctor of political science, originally of Turkish origin, and the founder of the Mediterranean Games. He was the chairman of the Egyptian Olympic Committee and also a member of the Executive Commission of the International Olympic Committee from 1952 to 1957.

Taher Pasha convinced the National Olympic Committees of the Mediterranean countries 1948 Summer Olympics held in London to create the Mediterranean Games.

Taher Pasha Trophy
In 1950, he gifted the Taher Pasha Trophy to the International Olympic Committee. The trophy is reserved for amateur athletes, regardless whether or not they compete in the Olympics, whose general merits or career appear to warrant a particular distinction in the name of the Olympic ideals. Recipients of the trophy, which is not necessarily awarded every year, have included:
 1951: Paul Anspach (1882–1981), Belgian fencer
 1952: Fanny Blankers-Koen, (1918–2004), Dutch athlete
 1953: Adhemar da Silva (1927–2001), Brazilian triple jumper
 1954: Adolphe Jauréguy (1898–1977), French rugby union player
 1955: Roger Bannister (born 1929), English middle-distance athlete
 1956: Gert Fredriksson (1919–2006), Swedish sprint canoeist
 1957: John Landy (born 1930), Australian middle-distance runner
 1960: Joaquín Blume (1933–1959), Spanish gymnast (posthumous award)
 1961: van de Wattyne, Belgian athlete
 1962: Phil Coleman (born 1931), American middle- and long-distance runner
 1963: 
 Iolanda Balaș (1936–2016), Romanian athlete
 Sjoukje Dijkstra (born 1942), Dutch figure skater
 1965: Sixten Jernberg (1929–2012), Swedish cross-country skier
 1966: Rodrigo de Castro Pereira (1887–1983), Portuguese tennis player
 1967: Eugenio Monti (1928–2003), Italian bobsledder
 1971: New Zealand eight, the rowing team that won the eight event at the 1971 European Rowing Championships

Notes

Egyptian people of Turkish descent
International Olympic Committee members
Mediterranean Games
1879 births
1970 deaths
Egyptian pashas